Gelora Samudra Stadium is a multi-purpose stadium in Badung, Indonesia. It is currently used mostly for football matches. It is the home of the PS Badung football club.

References

Badung Regency
Sport in Bali
Football venues in Indonesia
Football venues in Bali
Buildings and structures in Bali